Mycalesis subdita, the Tamil bushbrown, is a satyrine butterfly found in south India and Sri Lanka. It is not resolved whether this is a good species or is a subspecies of Mycalesis visala.

Description
Closely resembles in both seasonal forms Mycalesis mineus.  The male can be discriminated by the sex-mark on the underside of the forewing: this is brown or ochraceous brown as in M. perseoides but very much longer and broader, extending to but not going beyond the transverse band crossing the wings.

Footnotes

References
 

Mycalesis